Shahzada Husain Burhanuddin, also known as Husain Mufaddal Saifuddin, is the third and youngest son of Mufaddal Saifuddin, the current incumbent of the office of the 53rd Da'i al-Mutlaq. He is a Qāriʾ and an honorary member of Naqabāt Qurrāʾ al-Quran in Cairo. Burhanuddin is a provost of Aljamea-tus-Saifiyah and heads Mahad al-Zahra, through which he has been instrumental in the realization of his grand father Mohammed Burhanuddin's vision for Dawoodi Bohra community to seek enlightenment through Quranic values. He also administers a number of socio-economic institutions run by Dawoodi Bohra community.  Burhanuddin is a recipient of All India Council for Human Rights' Ambassador for Peace Award.

Career

Early life 
Burhanuddin was born on 24 December 1977 (15 Muḥarram al-Ḥarām 1398H) to Mufaddal Saifuddin and Jawaharatusharaf. He received his primary schooling at MSB Educational Institute in Mumbai.

Aljamea-tus-Saifiyah 
Burhanuddin is a senior member of the executive board of Aljamea-tus-Saifiyah. He oversees the academic and administrative affairs of the academy. He also teaches at the academy.

Mahad al-Zahra 
Husain Burhanuddin has been integral to Mahad al-Zahra's development. He focuses on Quranic science, recitation, and exegesis with a view to benefit the modern day society. In order to foster a better understanding of Quranic arts and sciences, under Burhanuddin's purview, Mahad al-Zahra distributed several guides and booklets to Dawoodi Bohra community centers world-wide, among them seven installments of Khazāʾin Maʿānī al-Qurʾān al-Fāʾiqah, a series for the non-Arabic speaking audiences to gain an insight into the meanings of the Quran.

Burhanuddin's emphasis on audio-visual teaching aids to facilitate learning has accelerated Quranic education within the community: Through its e-learning program, Mahad al-Zahra attracts thousands of applicants from around the world to participate in a combination of virtual classes along with one-to-one recital sessions through video-conferencing and internet telephony, aiding huffaz as young as 6 years old.

As of 2020, more than 8 branches of Mahad al-Zahra have been established at Dawoodi Bohra centers in India, Kenya, Kuwait, Pakistan, Tanzania, UAE, USA, and Yemen.

As the head of the Mahad al-Zahra, Burhanuddin conducts the final oral examinations for the Huffaz.

Community Outreach 
Under Burhanuddin's leadership, Mahad al-Zahra has become one of Aljamea-tus-Saifiyah's largest avenues for community outreach. Over the past two decades, the department has extended access to Quranic education to members of the Dawoodi Bohra community through numerous educational institutions established across the globe.

Burhanuddin frequently visits Dawoodi Bohra community centers in the Indian Sub-continent, Middle East, East Africa, Europe, and the United States to encourage accurate recitation of the Quran and facilitate its memorization: Between 2007 and 2011, at various venues, Burhanuddin conducted 3-day workshops designed to motivate and teach participants Quran memorization techniques.

Under Burhanuddin's administration, ḥuffāẓ are sent to various cities and towns all over the world during the month of Ramadān al-Muʿazzam, to conduct classes that help children as well as adults recite and memorize the Quran.

Today, he is said to be overlooking almost all the major departments and organisation of Dawat-e-Hadiyah an acting as the prime handler of the daily affairs of the organisation.

Personal life 

Burhanuddin has two elder brothers, Jafar us Sadiq Imaduddin and Taha Najmuddin and two sisters, Ummehani A. Nooruddin and Ruqaiyah A. Vajihuddin.

Husain's wife, Naqiyah, granddaughter of Mohammed Burhanuddin, runs the Rawdat al-Quran al-Kareem school in Mumbai.

Quranic Studies & Recitation 
By 1995 (1416H) he had completed memorization of the Quran. Three years later, in 1998, he graduated from Aljamea-tus-Saifiyah with the degree of al-Faqih al-Jayyid.

Shortly after memorizing the Quran, Burhanuddin frequented Cairo to study the art of recitation as well as the sciences of Quranic readings. He later released audio recording of the entire Quran in the murattal style of recitation, certified by al-Azhar University, Cairo.

Burhanuddin, in his capacity as a Qari, delivers 30-minute mujawwad recitations of the Quran which precede the sermons delivered by Mufaddal Saifuddin, especially during Ashara Mubarāka, since 2012.

On 29 Dhu al-Hijja 1439H (9 September 2018), he was certified in the Ten recitations al-Sughra from the recitations of al-Shatebiya and al-Durra.  On 25 July 2022, he published a book on the Ten recitations titled قراءات زاهرة لكتاب الله  which was published and certified by 'Muṣḥaf Revision Committee' at Al-Azhar University.

Works 
Burhanuddin has authored several audio and text books on Quran recitals, some are:
 Al-Taysīr fī Hifz al-Quran al-Karīm: A practical guide for memorizing al-Quran al-Kareem.
 Al-Muṣḥaf al-Murattal: Audio recording of the complete Quranic text in murattal (tartīl) style.
 Al-Muṣḥaf al-Muʿallim: A digital aid for the memorization of the 30th Juzʾ of al-Quran.
 Al-Muṣḥaf al-Mujawwad: Audio recording of the 30th juzʾ of al-Quran in mujawwad (tajwīd) style.
 Qira'aat Zahira le Kitab Allah (Arabic: قراءات زاهرة لكتاب الله)

Recognition and awards 

 : On 15 May 2015 (27 Rajab 1436H) Mufaddal Saifuddin, the 53rd Dai al-Mutlaq, bestowed upon him the cognomen of Burhan al-din.
 : Burhanuddin was conferred one of the highest degrees of Aljamea-tus-Saifiyah; al-ʿAlīm al-Bāriʿ on 3 May 2016 (27 Rajab 1437H).
 : Burhanuddin was conferred one of the highest degrees of Dawat-e-Hadiyah; Thiqat al-Daʿwat al-Ṭayyibīyyah on 3 May 2016 (27 Rajab 1437H).
 : Burhanuddin was a recipient of All India Council of Human Rights, Liberties, and Social Justice's Ambassador for Peace Award on 9 December 2019 "for protecting and promoting human rights, peace and harmony."
 : Honorary member of Naqabāt Qurrāʾ al-Quran in Cairo.

Notes

References

1977 births
Living people
Quran reciters